Strangesta is a genus of gastropods belonging to the family Rhytididae.

The species of this genus are found in Australia.

Species:

Strangesta confusa 
Strangesta maxima 
Strangesta ramsayi 
Strangesta strangei

References

Gastropods